Marcos Rogério de Lima (born May 25, 1985) is a Brazilian mixed martial artist who competes in the heavyweight division of the Ultimate Fighting Championship. A professional since 2009, he formerly competed for Strikeforce, Shooto, and was a contestant on The Ultimate Fighter: Brazil 3.

Mixed martial arts career

Early career
Lima made a name for himself fighting on his home country of Brazil. With an undefeated professional record, Lima surprised when defeated the heavy favorite and former WEC middleweight champion Paulo Filho.

After his win against Filho, Lima was signed by Strikeforce. He made his debut on September 10, 2011 against Mike Kyle at Strikeforce: Barnett vs. Kharitonov, losing the fight via unanimous decision.

Following his debut defeat, Lima was released from Strikeforce. He fought for the Shooto Brazil light heavyweight championship at Shooto Brazil 29 on April 26, 2012 against Carlos Eduardo, losing the fight via knockout in the second round.

The Ultimate Fighter

On February 26, 2014 it was revealed that Lima was selected to be a participant on The Ultimate Fighter: Brazil 3. Lima defeated Thiago Santos via submission to move into the Ultimate Fighter house, and become an official cast member.

Lima was selected as the first pick (first overall) of coach Chael Sonnen to be a part of Team Sonnen. In his second Heavyweight fight of the season, Lima was selected to fight Jollyson Francisco and won via unanimous decision. He was then scheduled to face Antônio Carlos Júnior for a spot in the final against Vitor Miranda. He was defeated by submission (rear-naked choke).

Ultimate Fighting Championship

Lima made his promotional debut on May 31, 2014 at The Ultimate Fighter Brazil 3 Finale against Richardson Moreira. He won the fight via knockout in the first round.

In his second bout for the promotion, Lima faced Igor Pokrajac in the light heavyweight division on December 20, 2014 at UFC Fight Night: Machida vs. Dollaway. He won the fight via TKO in the first round.

He was briefly linked to a bout with Nikita Krylov on June 20, 2015 at UFC Fight Night 69.  However, the pairing was booked to take place a week later at UFC Fight Night 70.  Subsequently, Lima was removed from the card on June 19, after visa issues restricted his entry to the United States.  The bout with Krylov eventually took place on August 23, 2015 at UFC Fight Night 74, with Lima losing by way of submission due to a rear naked choke in the first round.

Lima next faced Clint Hester on April 23, 2016 at UFC 197. He won the one sided fight via submission in the first round.

Lima was briefly linked to a bout with Gian Villante on November 12, 2016 at UFC 205. However, Villante pulled out of the fight on September 21 citing injury and the bout was scrapped. Subsequently, Lima was quickly rescheduled and faced promotional newcomer Gadzhimurad Antigulov the following week at UFC Fight Night 100. He was quickly submitted in the first round.

Lima next faced Jeremy Kimball at UFC on Fox: Shevchenko vs. Peña on January 28, 2017. At the weigh-ins, Lima came in at 209.5 lbs, over the light heavyweight limit of 206 lbs. As a result, Lima was fined 20% of his purse, which went to Kimball and the bout proceeded as scheduled at catchweight. He won the fight via TKO in the first round.

Lima next faced Ovince Saint Preux on April 22, 2017 at UFC Fight Night 108. At the weigh ins, Lima weighed in at 210 pounds, 4 pounds over the light heavyweight limit of 206. This was the second time consecutively Lima missed weight. As a result, he was fined 30% of his fight purse which will go to Saint Preux. The bout proceeded as a catchweight. He lost the fight via submission in the second round.

Lima was expected to face Saparbek Safarov on September 2, 2017 at UFC Fight Night 115. Before the weigh ins, the UFC announced that Lima had failed an out-of-competition drug screening, testing positive for the banned Anabolic steroids. As a result, the bout was cancelled. On April 24, 2018 Lima was cleared of intentional use of Performance-enhancing drugs (PEDs) by USADA, where Lima was believed to had taken tainted supplement which contained hydrochlorothiazide and anastrozole from the compounding pharmacies in Brazil. He is eligible to compete immediately as of April 24, 2018.

Lima faced Ruslan Magomedov on November 3, 2018 at UFC 230. However, it was reported on October 24, 2018 that he pulled out from the event due to visa issues and he was replaced by Adam Wieczorek. He won the fight via unanimous decision.

Lima faced Stefan Struve on February 23, 2019 at UFC on ESPN+ 3. He lost the fight via submission in the second round.

Lima faced Ben Sosoli on February 23, 2020 at UFC Fight Night: Felder vs. Hooker. He won the fight via TKO in the first round.

Lima was scheduled to face Alexander Romanov on September 5, 2020  at UFC Fight Night 176. However, on September 5, 2020, Lima was tested positive for Covid-19 and the bout against Romanov was cancelled. In turn, the bout was rescheduled and eventually took place on November 7, 2020 at UFC on ESPN: Santos vs. Teixeira. Lima lost the fight via a submission in round one.

Lima faced Maurice Greene on May 8, 2021 at UFC on ESPN 24. He won the fight via unanimous decision.

Lima faced Ben Rothwell on November 13, 2021 at UFC Fight Night 197. He won the fight via technical knockout in round one.

Lima faced Blagoy Ivanov on May 7, 2022 at UFC 274. He lost the fight via unanimous decision.

Lima faced Andrei Arlovski on October 29, 2022 at UFC Fight Night 213.  He won the fight via rear-naked choke in round one.

Lima is scheduled to face  Waldo Cortes-Acosta  on April 29, 2023 at UFC Fight Night 223.UFC Fight Night 224

Mixed martial arts record 

|-
|Win
|align=center|20–8–1
|Andrei Arlovski
|Submission (rear-naked choke)
|UFC Fight Night: Kattar vs. Allen
|
|align=center|1
|align=center|1:50
|Las Vegas, Nevada, United States
|
|-
|Loss
|align=center|19–8–1
|Blagoy Ivanov
|Decision (unanimous)
|UFC 274
|
|align=center|3
|align=center|5:00
|Phoenix, Arizona, United States
|
|-
|Win
|align=center|19–7–1
|Ben Rothwell
|TKO (punches)
|UFC Fight Night: Holloway vs. Rodríguez
|
|align=center|1
|align=center|0:32
|Las Vegas, Nevada, United States
|
|-
|Win
|align=center|18–7–1
|Maurice Greene
|Decision (unanimous)
|UFC on ESPN: Rodriguez vs. Waterson
|
|align=center|3
|align=center|5:00
|Las Vegas, Nevada, United States
|
|-
|Loss
|align=center|17–7–1
|Alexander Romanov
|Technical Submission (forearm choke)
|UFC on ESPN: Santos vs. Teixeira
|
|align=center|1
|align=center|4:48
|Las Vegas, Nevada, United States
|
|-
|Win
|align=center|17–6–1
|Ben Sosoli
|TKO (punches)
|UFC Fight Night: Felder vs. Hooker 
|
|align=center|1
|align=center|1:28
|Auckland, New Zealand
|
|-
|Loss
|align=center|16–6–1
|Stefan Struve
|Submission (arm-triangle choke)	
|UFC Fight Night: Błachowicz vs. Santos 
|
|align=center|2
|align=center|2:21
|Prague, Czech Republic
|
|-
|Win
|align=center|16–5–1
|Adam Wieczorek
|Decision (unanimous)
|UFC 230 
|
|align=center|3
|align=center|5:00
|New York City, New York, United States
||
|-
|Loss
|align=center|15–5–1
|Ovince Saint Preux
|Submission (Von Flue choke)
|UFC Fight Night: Swanson vs. Lobov
|
|align=center|2
|align=center|2:11
|Nashville, Tennessee, United States
|
|-
|Win
|align=center|15–4–1
|Jeremy Kimball
|TKO (punches)
|UFC on Fox: Shevchenko vs. Peña
|
|align=center|1
|align=center|2:27
|Denver, Colorado, United States
|
|-
|Loss
|align=center|14–4–1
|Gadzhimurad Antigulov
|Submission (guillotine choke)
|UFC Fight Night: Bader vs. Nogueira 2
|
|align=center|1
|align=center|1:07
|São Paulo, Brazil
|  
|-
|Win
|align=center|14–3–1
|Clint Hester
|Submission (arm-triangle choke)
|UFC 197
|
|align=center|1
|align=center|4:35
|Las Vegas, Nevada, United States
| 
|-
|Loss
|align=center|13–3–1
|Nikita Krylov
|Submission (rear-naked choke)
|UFC Fight Night: Holloway vs. Oliveira
|
|align=center|1
|align=center|2:29
|Saskatoon, Saskatchewan, Canada
|
|-
|Win
|align=center| 13–2–1
|Igor Pokrajac
| TKO (punches)
| UFC Fight Night: Machida vs. Dollaway
| 
|align=center| 1
|align=center| 1:59
|Barueri, Brazil
|
|-
|Win
|align=center| 12–2–1
|Richardson Moreira
| KO (punches)
| The Ultimate Fighter Brazil 3 Finale: Miocic vs. Maldonado
| 
|align=center| 1
|align=center| 0:20
| São Paulo, Brazil
|
|-
|Draw
|align=center| 11–2–1
|Ben Reiter
| Draw
| Inka FC 22
| 
|align=center| 3
|align=center| 5:00
| Lima, Peru
|
|-
| Win
|align=center| 11–2
|Antonio Sales Junior
| TKO (punches)
| Fair Fight: MMA Edition
| 
|align=center| 1
|align=center| 3:46
| São Paulo, Brazil
|
|-
| Win
|align=center| 10–2
|Valter Luiz da Silva
| TKO (punches)
| Max Sport 3.1
| 
|align=center| 1
|align=center| 4:20
| São Paulo, Brazil
|
|-
| Win
|align=center| 9–2
|Fabiano Adams
| Submission (arm-triangle choke)
| Shooto Brazil 31
| 
|align=center| 1
|align=center| 3:33
| Brasília, Brazil
|
|-
| Loss
|align=center| 8–2
|Carlos Eduardo
| KO (punches)
| Shooto Brazil 29
| 
|align=center| 2
|align=center| 0:17
| Rio de Janeiro, Brazil
|
|-
| Loss
|align=center| 8–1
|Mike Kyle
| Decision (unanimous)
| Strikeforce: Barnett vs. Kharitonov
| 
|align=center| 3
|align=center| 5:00
| Cincinnati, Ohio, United States
|
|-
| Win
|align=center| 8–0
|Paulo Filho
| Decision (unanimous)
| First Class Fight 5
| 
|align=center| 3
|align=center| 5:00
| São Paulo, Brazil
|
|-
| Win
|align=center| 7–0
|Daniel Villegas
| TKO (punches)
| MFC 4: Chile vs. The World
| 
|align=center| N/A
|align=center| N/A
| Santiago, Chile
|
|-
| Win
|align=center| 6–0
|Leonardo Lucio Nascimento
| TKO (punches)
| First Class Fight 4
| 
|align=center| 2
|align=center| N/A
| São Paulo, Brazil
|
|-
| Win
|align=center| 5–0
|Nelson Martins
| TKO (submission to punches)
| Nitrix Champion Fight 5
| 
|align=center| 2
|align=center| 0:48
| Balneário Camboriú, Brazil
|
|-
| Win
|align=center| 4–0
|Rafael Navas
| TKO (punches)
| Full Fight 2
| 
|align=center| 1
|align=center| 3:49
| São Paulo, Brazil
|
|-
| Win
|align=center| 3–0
|Silvério Bueno
| KO (punch)
| Ares Chaos MMA
| 
|align=center| 1
|align=center| 0:39
| São Paulo, Brazil
|
|-
| Win
|align=center| 2–0
|Antonio Conceição
| KO (punch)
| Renegade Fight Championship 3
| 
|align=center| 1
|align=center| 1:55
| Bebedouro, Brazil
|
|-
| Win
|align=center| 1–0
|Amauri Gumz
| TKO (punches)
| Renegade Fight Championship 1
| 
|align=center| 1
|align=center| N/A
| Bebedouro, Brazil
|

Mixed martial arts exhibition record

|-
|Loss 
|align=center| 2–1
|Antônio Carlos Júnior
| Submission (rear-naked choke)
| TUF Brasil 3
| (airdate)
|align=center| 1
|align=center| 3:22
| São Paulo, Brazil
|
|-
|Win
|align=center| 2–0
|Jollyson Francisco
| Decision (unanimous)
| TUF Brasil 3
| (airdate)
|align=center| 2
|align=center| 5:00
| São Paulo, Brazil
|
|-
| Win
|align=center| 1–0
|Thiago Santos
| Submission (guillotine choke)
| TUF Brasil 3
|  (airdate)
|align=center| 1
|align=center| N/A
| São Paulo, Brazil
|

See also
 List of current UFC fighters
 List of male mixed martial artists

References

External links
 
 

1985 births
Living people
Brazilian practitioners of Brazilian jiu-jitsu
People awarded a black belt in Brazilian jiu-jitsu
Brazilian male mixed martial artists
Heavyweight mixed martial artists
Mixed martial artists utilizing Brazilian jiu-jitsu
Sportspeople from São Paulo (state)
Ultimate Fighting Championship male fighters